This is a list of artists who were born in the Bahamas or whose artworks are closely associated with that country. Artists are listed by field of study and then by last name in alphabetical order, and they may be listed more than once, if they work in many fields of study.

Designers 
 Raymond Roker, American graphic designer, electronic music DJ, and club promoter; of Bahamian and Jewish descent.
 Gio Swaby (born 1991), textile artist and designer

Painters 
 Amos Ferguson (1920–2009), folk artist and painter
 Kendal Hanna (born 1936), painter and sculptor, the Bahamas’ first abstract expressionist
 Christophe Roberts (born 1980), multidisciplinary artist working in sculpture, graphic design, painting, and creative direction
 Horace Kenton Wright (1915–1976), watercolorist, painter

Photographers 
 Tamika Galanis, photographer, filmmaker, writer, researcher

Sculptors 
 Janine Antoni (born 1964), Bahamian–born American multidisciplinary artist and sculptor 
 Blue Curry (born 1974), sculptural assemblage and installation art
 Antonius Roberts (born 1958), sculptor and installation artist
 Christophe Roberts (born 1980), multidisciplinary artist working in sculpture, graphic design, painting, and creative direction
 Tavares Strachan (born 1979), Bahamian-born American conceptual artist, known for his sculptures and installation art

See also 
 List of Bahamians
 List of Bahamian women artists

Artists 
Artists
Bahamian